Israel Houghton (born May 19, 1971) is an American contemporary Christian music singer, songwriter, producer and worship leader. He is usually credited as Israel & New Breed.

Musical career

Houghton produced an album by Michael Gungor, Bigger Than My Imagination, which was described as "one of the year's best worship albums" in a 2003 Christianity Today review.

Israel & New Breed
New Breed is the backing band of Israel Houghton. Many of Israel's album releases are credited to Israel & New Breed.

Discography

Other recordings 
2002: "Champions for Christ" – Hi5 (worship leader)
2004: "Where Are the Fathers?" from He-Motions (EMI Gospel)
2003: "Send Me to the Nations" from A Wing & a Prayer (EMI Gospel)
2002: We Speak to Nations (Lakewood Live; Integrity)
2003: Cover the Earth (Lakewood Live; Integrity)
2006: The Gift: A Christmas Presentation (Lakewood Live)
2007: Free to Worship (Lakewood Live)
2007: Moving Forward (Free Chapel Live)
2008: Hope for Today Worship (Lakewood Live)
2009: Free Chapel Live: Power of the Cross (Integrity)
2009: New Breed Live: Generation Love 
2011: Echo: Forward Conference (Free Chapel Live)
2014: Covenant Worship: Kingdom
2014: Rey De Mi Universo (Lucía Parker)
2016: Eres Mi Todo (Job González)
2018:  DeMaskUs

Personal life 

Houghton is of mixed parentage, he was born to a white mother and Afro-Jamaican father. Houghton and his college girlfriend had a son together. Houghton was later married to Meleasa Houghton from 1994, they had 3 children together. They  separated in 2015, with the divorce being finalized on February 22, 2016. While married, the musician also fathered two sons with mistress DeVawn Moreno. On November 11, 2016, Houghton married singer and TV personality Adrienne Bailon in Paris, after several months of dating. In 2022, the couple welcomed their first child together, a son, born via surrogate.

Awards and nominations 
Among the awards that Houghton has won includes six Grammy Awards; three for Best Pop/Contemporary Gospel Album and one for Best Traditional Gospel Album for Alive In South Africa.

References

 CBN Interview with Israel Houghton

External links 
 
 Biography at Houghton's Label
 
 

1971 births
20th-century American singers
21st-century American singers
American gospel singers
Grammy Award winners
Living people
People from Oceanside, California
Performers of contemporary worship music
Promise Keepers
20th-century American male singers
21st-century American male singers